Koh Kong, or Koh Kong Krao, is an island in the Gulf of Thailand, in the coastal waters of Cambodia, around  south of Koh Kong town, as it is part of Koh Kong Province. It is Cambodia's largest island.

Location and description

The only settlements are small fishing villages, Alatang on the south-east corner, Phumi Koh Kong on the west coast and Phumi Thmei (Khmer for new village) on the eastern coast.
Rivers that drain the mountains end in freshwater estuaries and countless lagoons, which are flanked by scenic beaches.

Sleeping

The north end is controlled by the military, camping is allowed at your own risk on the 5th and 6th beaches and also at the military post in the village of Alatang.

Wildlife

Koh Kong Island is in the much larger Cardamom Rainforest Ecozone, and the island is covered in evergreen tropical rainforest, fed by the annual monsoon from the Gulf of Thailand. Mangroves cover some of the coastal areas and estuaries.

The island is home to a number of mammals such as macaques, wild boar and indigenous squirrels, bird, such as horn-bills, mynah and small Psittaciformes. The entire eco-region of Koh Kong remains in a relatively original state and is home to a great variety of reptiles and amphibians, invertebrates, fungi and plants. Large areas of Koh Kong's eastern coast and the Bay of Koh Kong are engulfed in extensive mangrove forests, the basis for various aquatic and marine species.  The giant moth Attacus atlas can be found on the island.

Marine life
Under water, coral reefs and swathes of seagrass are scattered across the shallow, and sandy coastal areas, supporting a prolific marine life. It is expected that the waters surrounding the island will be part of a new marine national park in 2021. In June 2020, a committee headed by the Cambodian Minister of Environment was established, on initiative of the Royal Government, tasked with reviewing and overseeing any future construction and development projects on Koh Kong Krao. The committee is needed, as the island is part of a Special Economic Zone (SEZ), encouraging economic development.  

The marine fauna around the island includes harmless whale sharks, sea turtles, dugongs, dolphins (endangered Irrawaddy dolphins, finless porpoises, and Chinese white dolphins), Parrot fish, snapper fish, barracuda, king fish, cobia fish, wahoo fish, swordfish, grouper fish, crabs, shrimps, squids.

See also 
 Koh Rong
 Koh Sdach
 List of islands of Cambodia
 List of Cambodian inland islands

References

Islands of Cambodia
Geography of Koh Kong province
Islands of the Gulf of Thailand